Julia Copus FRSL (born 1969) is a British poet, biographer and children's writer.

Biography
Copus was born in London and grew up with three brothers, two of whom went on to become musicians. She attended The Mountbatten School, a comprehensive in Romsey, and Peter Symonds Sixth Form College. She went on to study Latin at St Mary's College, Durham.

Copus' books of poetry include The Shuttered Eye (Bloodaxe, 1995), which won her an Eric Gregory Award and was shortlisted for the Forward Prize for Best First Collection, the pamphlet Walking in the Shadows (1994), which won the Poetry Business competition, In Defence of Adultery (Bloodaxe, 2003), The World's Two Smallest Humans (Faber, 2012), shortlisted for both the Costa Book Awards (poetry category) and the T.S. Eliot Prize, and Girlhood (Faber 2019), winner of the inaugural Derek Walcott Prize for Poetry. She is known for establishing a new form in English poetry, which she has called the specular form, in which the second half of the poem mirrors the first, using the same lines but in reverse order and differently punctuated.

Eenie Meenie Macka Racka (an original 45-minute play for radio) was first broadcast on BBC Radio 4 in September, 2003, having been commissioned after Copus won the BBC's Alfred Bradley Bursary Award for Best New Radio Playwright in 2002. In the same year, she won First Prize in the National Poetry Competition with Breaking the Rule.

Copus was awarded a Royal Literary Fund Fellowship at the University of Exeter in 2005, 2006 and 2007, and the following year was made an RLF Advisory Fellow and awarded an Honorary Fellowship at the University of Exeter. In 2010, she won the Forward Prize for Best Single Poem for An Easy Passage. She has served on the judging panel for a number of literary prizes, including the Geoffrey Faber Memorial Prize, the Ted Hughes Award, the Costa Book Award, the UK's National Poetry Competition, the Encore Award for best second novel, the Michael Marks Awards and T. S. Eliot Prize for poetry.

Copus has also written four picture books: Hog in the Fog, The Hog, The Shrew and the Hullabaloo (Faber 2015), The Shrew that Flew (Faber 2016) and My Bed is an Air Balloon (Faber 2018).

Personal life
She lives in Curry Mallet, with her husband, Andrew Stevenson.

Publications

Poetry collections 
 The Shuttered Eye, Bloodaxe Books 1995. 
 In Defence of Adultery, Bloodaxe Books 2003. 
 The World's Two Smallest Humans, Faber 2012. 
 Girlhood, Faber 2019.

For children 
 The Landlord's Cat, Out of the Ark Music 2010 (with Antony Copus)
 A Harry & Lil story: Hog in the Fog, Faber 2014
 A Harry & Lil story: The Hog, the Shrew and the Hullabaloo, Faber 2015
 A Harry & Lil story: The Shrew that Flew, Faber 2016
My Bed is an Air Balloon, Faber 2018

As editor 
 Life Support: 100 Poems to Reach for on Dark Nights (Head of Zeus 2019)
 Charlotte Mew: Selected Poems and Prose (Faber 2019)

Non-fiction 
 This Rare Spirit: A Life of Charlotte Mew, Faber 2021
 Brilliant Writing Tips for Students, Palgrave Macmillan 2009

For radio 
 Eenie Meenie Macka Racka, afternoon play, BBC Radio 4, September 2003
 The Enormous Radio (based on the short story by John Cheever), afternoon play, BBC Radio 4, July 2008
 Ghost Lines, a sequence of poems for radio, BBC Radio 3, December 2011
 The Heart of Hidden Things, on the life and work of Charlotte Mew, BBC Radio 4, November 2019

Audio 
 Julia Copus Reading from Her Poems,  (CD) The Poetry Archive 2010

Selected awards
 1994 Eric Gregory Award (Society of Authors)
 1997 The Shuttered Eye shortlisted for Forward Poetry Prize for Best First Collection 
 2002 National Poetry Competition, First Prize - 'Breaking the Rule'
 2002 BBC Alfred Bradley Bursary Award for Best New Radio Playwright, Eenie Meenie Macka Racka
 2005 Arts Council Writers' Award
 2010 Forward Poetry Prize (Best Single Poem), 'An Easy Passage'
 2011 Ghost Lines shortlisted for Ted Hughes Award for New Work in Poetry
 2012 Costa Book Awards (poetry category), shortlist, The World's Two Smallest Humans 
 2012 T S Eliot Prize, shortlist, The World's Two Smallest Humans
 2014 Authors' Foundation Grant (Society of Authors)
 2020 Derek Walcott Prize for Poetry, for Girlhood

References

External links
Julia Copus author page on the Faber & Faber website
Julia Copus reading her poems on The Poetry Archive
 Julia Copus biography page on the Royal Literary Fund website

British poets
21st-century British poets
21st-century English poets
21st-century English writers
21st-century British women writers
21st-century English women writers
1969 births
Living people
English women poets
English women dramatists and playwrights
Alumni of St Mary's College, Durham